William Opoku Asiedu (born 1 April 1997) is a Ghanaian professional footballer who plays as a midfielder. Besides Ghana, he has played in England, Estonia, Nepal and India.

Club career
Opoku's career began in Ghana with Division One club Okyeman Planners. He scored eleven goals in his final season, 2016, with Okyeman. In February 2017, Opoku joined Premier League team Middlesbrough on a long-term contract. He was immediately loaned out to Levadia Tallinn of the Meistriliiga for eighteen months. He made his Levadia debut on 3 March in the league versus Flora. During his time in Estonia, Opoku mainly featured for their reserve team in the Esiliiga. In total, he scored seven goals in fifteen games in the tier two. His loan with Levadia was terminated in June 2017.

On 26 September, Opoku joined I-League side Minerva Punjab. He made a goalscoring debut for Minerva in a 2017 Punjab State Football League match against Dalbir FA. In I-League action, Opoku scored three goals in his first four appearances. On 8 March 2018, Opoku scored the winning goal in a 1–0 win over Churchill Brothers which secured the 2017–18 I-League title. He extended his contract for one more year in September 2018. However, in 2019, Opoku moved to Ozone of the I-League 2nd Division. Months after, he headed to Calcutta Football League team BSS Sporting Club.

2020 saw Opoku move across Kolkata to Bhawanipore. In September of the same year, Opoku headed back to the I-League 2nd Division with Bengaluru United.

International career
Opoku has represented Ghana at U20 level, featuring during the 2017 Africa U-20 Cup of Nations qualifying campaign.

Career statistics
.

Honours
Minerva Punjab
I-League: 2017–18

References

External links

1997 births
Living people
Footballers from Accra
Ghanaian footballers
Ghana under-20 international footballers
Association football midfielders
Ghanaian expatriate footballers
Expatriate footballers in Estonia
Expatriate footballers in India
Ghanaian expatriate sportspeople in England
Expatriate footballers in England
Ghanaian expatriate sportspeople in Estonia
Ghanaian expatriate sportspeople in India
Meistriliiga players
Esiliiga players
I-League players
I-League 2nd Division players
Middlesbrough F.C. players
FCI Levadia Tallinn players
FCI Levadia U21 players
RoundGlass Punjab FC players
Ozone FC players
Bhawanipore FC players
FC Bengaluru United players
Expatriate footballers in Nepal
Nepal Super League players
Calcutta Football League players